Media Prima Berhad, doing business as Media Prima and stylised as media prima, is a Malaysian media company based in Petaling Jaya, Selangor. It is Malaysia's largest media and entertainment conglomerate with business interests in television, print, radio, out-of-home advertising, content creation and digital media. The Group operates five television channels — TV3, DidikTV KPM, 8TV, TV9 and Wow Shop and also five radio stations – Buletin FM, Fly FM, 8FM, Hot FM and Molek FM. Media Prima is also the owner of New Straits Times Press, Malaysia's largest newspaper publisher with five national news brands – New Straits Times, Berita Harian, Harian Metro, Sin Chew Daily and Guang Ming Daily.

The company was formed in 2003 out of the demerger of Malaysian Resources Corporation Berhad (MRCB) media assets, namely Sistem Televisyen Malaysia Berhad (which runs TV3) and The New Straits Times Press (Malaysia) Berhad, which the latter held since 1993. The Group currently ranks third in Malaysia in digital reach following the 2017 acquisition of REV Asia Holdings, one of Southeast Asia's leading digital media groups. In 2018, Media Prima became the number one choice for mobile content ahead of Google and Facebook.

Business divisions

Media Prima Television Networks
Media Prima owns and operates five free-to-air television channels, each of them functioning under their own branding and subsidiaries. TV3 and NTV7 were established long before Media Prima exist, while others, 8TV and TV9 were formed through the group's acquisition of defunct television companies.

WOWSHOP is the group's teleshopping network. It was established on 22 February 2016 as CJ Wow Shop, a joint venture with Korean conglomerate CJ Group's subsidiary, CJ E&M. The teleshopping network became a fully owned subsidiary after the group bought CJ's remaining 49% stake. Apart from TV3, NTV7, 8TV, TV9 and Malaysia's No.1 edutainment channel, DidikTV KPM, Wow Shop is also available in two purpose-built channels on my Freeview. Tonton is the group's Over-the-top media service (OTT) which covers viewers across multiple devices such as computers, tablets, smartphones.

Media Prima Audio
Media Prima Audio (formerly known as Media Prima Radio Networks and later Ripple) is an audience-focused digital media, broadcast and commerce company. It includes five radio broadcast brands – 8FM (formerly One FM), Buletin FM (formerly Kool FM), Fly FM, Hot FM, Molek FM and a podcast platform – Audio+ (formerly Ais Kacang). As of November 2021, based on the October 2021 Gfk Radio Survey, Media Prima Audio is the most popular radio network in Malaysia with over 5 million listeners and 57 million digital listeners since its rival, Astro Radio.

New Straits Times Press
Media Prima owns more than 98% equity interest in The New Straits Times Press (Malaysia) Berhad (“NSTP”), which owns three of Malaysia's most recognised print and online news brands – New Straits Times, Berita Harian and Harian Metro, as well as their respective weekend editions. Apart from News brands, New Straits Times Press also owned subsidiary Print Towers Sdn Bhd, tertiary education reference website Mind Campus and learning portal FullAMark.

Out-of-home advertising

Big Tree
Kurnia Outdoor
UPD
The Right Channel
Gotcha
Big Tree Seni Jaya

Production and distribution 

 Primeworks Studios
 Primeworks Distribution 
 Alternate Records & Talents

Media Prima's content creation arm, Primeworks Studios Sdn Bhd, is one of Malaysia's production houses with content output in diverse categories covering television, cinema, and digital platforms. While it starts producing television series as early as 1984, Primeworks only began to identify themselves by introducing their own logo in July 2008 to distinguish from Grand Brilliance, another Media Prima subsidiary which was established in 1995.

Media Prima Digital
Media Prima Digital, also known as REV Media consists of the following brands:

 8Coin (English)
 Audience Plus (English)
 IGN Southeast Asia (English)
 Juice online (English)
 Mashable Southeast Asia (English)
 Kongsi Resipi (Malay)
 My Game On (Malay)
 MyResipi (Malay)
 Oh Bulan! (Malay)
 Sirap Limau (Malay)
 Vocket (Malay)
 Rojaklah (Chinese)
 Tantan News (Chinese)
 Viral Cham (Chinese)
 Says (English and Malay)
 TechNave (English, Malay and Chinese)
 Tonton
 Tonton Xtra
 Media Prima Labs

Integrated Solution Provider
 Media Prima Omnia

Former
TV3 Ghana (1999–2011)

Board of Directors 
 Group Chairman
 Datuk Seri (Dr.) Syed Hussain Aljunid
 Group Managing Director
 Rafiq Razali
 Independent Non-Executive Director
 Abdullah Abu Samah
 Dato’ Sivananthan Shanmugam
 Datuk Phang Ah Tong
 Datuk Shireen Ann Zaharah Muhiudeen

Senior Management Team

 Group Managing Director
 Rafiq Razali
 Group Chief Financial Officer
 Rosli Sabarudin
 Chief Executive Officer (Media Prima Omnia)
 Datuk Michael Chan
 Chief Executive Officer (Media Prima Television Networks & Primeworks Studios)
 Dato' Khairul Anwar Salleh
 Chief Executive Officer (New Straits Times Press)
 Mustapha Kamil Mohd Janor
 Chief Executive Officer (REV Media Group)
 Samuel Wee
 Chief Executive Officer (BIG TREE)
 Shukor Ariffin
 Chief Executive Officer (Media Prima Audio)
 Nazri Noran
 Acting Chief Executive Officer (WOWSHOP)
 Datin Norashikin Habibur Rahman

Incidents

2018 bomb threat
On 28 August 2018, Media Prima's Sri Pentas headquarters was forced to evacuate following a false bomb threat. The police gave an order to evacuate the company's office at 10.30 pm. About 200 Media Prima employees were evacuated from the building. They were allowed to re-enter the building after two hours of inspection. The police did not find anything suspicious.

Following the cancellation of Nightline, TV3 aired the announcement about the incident. Royal Malaysia Police's bomb detector unit arrived at 11.40 pm to handle the case. The Fire and Rescue Department received the phone call from the police at 11.19 pm following the incident. The case was investigated under Section 506 of the Penal Code, and the police found it was a false bomb threat. Two men were arrested in Temerloh, Pahang on 29 August 2018.

References

External links
 The Task to revive TV3

 
Mass media companies of Malaysia
Mass media companies established in 2003
2003 establishments in Malaysia
Conglomerate companies of Malaysia
Companies listed on Bursa Malaysia
Television companies of Malaysia
Newspaper companies of Malaysia
Radio stations in Malaysia
Outdoor advertising agencies
Online publishing companies
Film production companies of Malaysia
Digital media organizations